August "Augie" Meyers (born May 31, 1940) is an American musician, singer, songwriter, performer, studio musician, record producer, and record label owner. He is perhaps best known as a founding member of the Sir Douglas Quintet and the Texas Tornados.

History
He was born in San Antonio, Texas, United States. In the early 1960s, Meyers and Doug Sahm founded the Sir Douglas Quintet. His Vox organ was a familiar element of the group's sound, as heard on tracks like "She's About a Mover" (1964), "Mendocino" (1969), and "Nuevo Laredo" (1970).

In the 1990s, Meyers co-founded the successful supergroup known as the Texas Tornados with Doug Sahm, Flaco Jiménez, and Freddy Fender.

Since the 1970s, Meyers has operated several of his own record labels, including the Texas Re-Cord Company (co-founded with Lucky Tomblin), Superbeet Records, White Boy Records, and El Sendero.

As a studio musician, Meyers has played on numerous releases by other artists, including Bob Dylan, John P. Hammond, Tom Jones, John & Mary, Tom Waits, Raul Malo, and Doug Sahm.

Meyers lives in the Texas Hill Country town of Bulverde.

Select album discography
1971: The Western Head Music Co. (Polydor)
1972: You Ain’t Rollin’ Your Roll Rite (Paramount)
1975: Live At The Longneck (Texas Re-Cord Company)
1977: Finally In Lights (Texas Re-Cord Company)
1982: Still Growin (Sonet)
1984: August in New York (Sonet)
1986: Augie's Back (Sonet)
1986: My Main Squeeze (Superbeet)
1988: Sausalito Sunshine (Superbeet)
1992: White Boy (White Boy)
1996: Alive & Well At Lake Taco (White Boy)
2002: Blame It On Love (Texas World)
2006: My Freeholies Ain’t Free Anymore (El Sendero)
2013: Loves Lost and Found (El Sendero)

Select collaborations
1991: John and Mary, Victory Gardens (Rykodisc)
1997: Bob Dylan, Time Out Of Mind (Columbia)
2001: Bob Dylan, Love And Theft (Columbia)
2005: John P. Hammond, In Your Arms Again (Back Porch)
2014: Ben Vaughn, Texas Roadtrip (Many Moods)
2021: The Mal Thursday Quintet, If 6 Was 5 (Chunk Archives Recordings)

References

External links
 

1940 births
Living people
Musicians from San Antonio
American country singer-songwriters
American country rock singers
American male singer-songwriters
Singer-songwriters from Texas
Texas Tornados members
Sir Douglas Quintet members
People from Bulverde, Texas
Country musicians from Texas